is a manga written by Sho Fumimura, and illustrated by Ryoichi Ikegami. It was serialized in Big Comic Superior from 1990 to 1995, then released into 12 volumes by Shogakukan. It was published as 46 comic books and collected as nine volumes in America by Viz Graphics from 1995 to 1997. Sanctuary was a bestseller in Japan, and inspired an anime OVA and a series of live-action films.

Plot 
Sanctuary is a story that featured two childhood friends, Akira Hojo and Chiaki Asami, who ruthlessly struggle to set a new paradigm of living in Japan. However, the two friends take radically different paths (playing rock-paper-scissors to decide their roles): Akira chooses the dark path and joins a Yakuza gang, while Chiaki strives to become the youngest member of the Japanese Diet. As survivors of the Cambodian killing fields, the two characters develop an unmatched aggression and survival instincts, helping them to achieve their common ultimate goal: making Japan their own sanctuary.

The story starts with Hojo as a minor mob boss and Asami as a political advisor. The plot first focuses on their rise to positions of greater power. Hojo's rise is decidedly quicker than Asami's, whose struggle to get to the top lasts the entire manga. Hojo is a Yakuza Don by book 2. The story then follows his attempts to gain control over the entire Yakuza while secretly paving the way for them to become a legitimate enterprise.  Asami, meanwhile, must try to enter the Diet by forming his own party that represents the younger people of Japan.  He is constantly opposed by the current Dietmen, who are aging politicians intent on holding onto power (often considered to be a thinly-veiled reference to the Liberal Democratic Party).

By the end of the series, both Hojo and Asami succeed in their ambitions. Hojo successfully unites all of the major Yakuzas under his banner to extend the longevity of Yakuza (through educational reform) while Asami successfully becomes the youngest nominated politician to become Prime Minister of Japan. At the end of their journey, they return to where it all began: Cambodia. Unfortunately, Asami dies due to illness.

Characters 

Portrayed by: Toshiya Nakasawa
Asami's childhood friend, he is heading towards domination over Japan's Yakuza corporations. By the end of the story, Hojo runs for the Diet.

Portrayed by: Hiroshi Abe
Ambitious and strong-willed politician. He lived in Cambodia with Hojo's family in the 1970s. Asami's personal nemesis is Isaoka.

An "old fox" with all the connections one can imagine at every economic, politic and illegal level possible. He served a prison sentence in Sugamo Prison after World War II.

Hojo's former mentor, a through-and-through Yakuza who serves his boss efficiently, with an unshakeable loyalty.

Portrayed by: Toshihiko Sakakibara
Young assistant of Hojo, who saved his new-born baby years ago. As with Tokai, he would give his life for his boss.

Portrayed by: Azusa Nakamura
Deputy-chief in the district of Tokyo. Born in 1965 (vol.1 chap. 2) she is 27 at the time of the story. Went to Tokyo University. Kyoko later falls for Hojo and the feelings are mutual.

Portrayed by: Naomasa Musaka
Subaltern of Ishihara, he knows Tokai very well, but he's a good policeman nonetheless.

The Trade Minister of the U.S. who falls for Asami and becomes a loyal foreign ally.

Yuki
Asami's lover, a university student.

 Hojo's advisor in the Yakuza.

A Hong Kong Don who at first double crosses Hojo and Asami before later aiding them again.

 A Don who owes Hojo his life.

Ibuki
 A Don from Kobe and ally of Hojo.

The son of an old school politician who is both a trouble maker and playboy. He does everything he can to avenge his father's death and joins forces with Asami.

Leader of the Okinawan mafia.

Media

Manga
Viz Media's English release was translated by cultural anthropologist Rachel Thorn. It was nominated for the 1995 Harvey Award for Best American Edition of Foreign Material.

Volume list

Adaptations
Sanctuary was adapted in both a one-shot anime OVA and live-action theatrical release. Both versions were released in North America by Viz Media.

See also

References

External links
 
 
 
 

1995 films
1996 anime OVAs
Juvenile delinquency in fiction
Political thriller anime and manga
Ryoichi Ikegami
Seinen manga
Shogakukan franchises
Shogakukan manga
Viz Media manga
Yoshiyuki Okamura